Paulina Vinderman (born 9 May 1944) is an Argentine poet and translator.

Career
Paulina Vinderman has participated in international poetry festivals such as those of Granada (2013) and Medellín. Her work has been included in numerous anthologies, and many of her poems have been translated into English, Italian and German. She has contributed to publications of Buenos Aires and Hispano-America with poems, articles, and literary reviews, among them La Nación, La Prensa, Clarín, Diario de Poesía, and Intramuros. She published in Feminaria, a feminist theory journal that was published from 1988 to 2008. Among the Hispano-American publications are El Espectador (Colombia), Hora de Poesía (Spain),  (Venezuela), and Hispamérica (United States). She participated in the workshop cycle "La Pluma y la Palabra", organized by the Society of Writers of Argentina, on the theme of poetry (7 July 2006).

Vinderman has translated works by John Oliver Simon, Emily Dickinson, Michael Ondaatje, Sylvia Plath, and James Merrill into Spanish.

She is a graduate of Biochemistry at the University of Buenos Aires, a field that she practiced in for some years.

Selected publications

Awards
 Second and Third Municipal Prize of Buenos Aires (1998–99 and 1988–89 respectively)
 National Regional Award of the Secretary of Culture (1993–96)
 2002 Gold Letters Award of the Honorarte Foundation
 First Municipal Prize of Buenos Aires (2002–2003)
 Literary Award of the Academia Argentina de Letras, Poetry genre, 2004–2006
 2002 and 2005 Fondo Nacional de las Artes Awards 
 2006 Anillo del Arte Award for Notable Women
 2006 Citta' di Cremona Award
 2007 Municipal Poetry Prize

References

External links
 

1944 births
Living people
20th-century Argentine poets
20th-century Argentine women writers
20th-century Argentine writers
21st-century Argentine poets
21st-century Argentine women writers
21st-century Argentine writers
Argentine translators
Argentine women poets
English–Spanish translators
University of Buenos Aires alumni
Writers from Buenos Aires